A by-election was held in the Tongatapu 9 constituency of Tonga on 15 September 2011. It was triggered by the death of the incumbent, first time MP Kaveinga Faʻanunu, who died of head and neck cancer on 24 July. Under the first past the post system, Faʻanunu had won the newly established single-member seat for the Democratic Party of the Friendly Islands in the November 2010 general election, with 34% of the vote, and a majority of 494 votes (18.5%), appearing to make it a relatively safe seat for the party (which was a junior partner in Lord Tuʻivakano's government).

Candidates
On 18 August, the Tongan government announced that six candidates had been registered for the by-election, without however specifying what political party any of them might be a member of. They were Konisitutone Simana Kamii, Siaosi ʻEnosi Tuʻipulotu, Viliami Fukofuka, Sevenitini Toumoʻua, ʻEpeli Taufa Kalimani, and Falisi Tupou. The first five had stood unsuccessfully in the November general election – most notably Sevenitini Toumoʻua, who had finished second to Faʻanunu with 15.5% of the vote.

Result
Falisi Tupou, the candidate of the Democratic Party of the Friendly Islands, won the seat with 32.8% of the vote.

2010 result

References

2011 elections in Oceania
2011 in Tonga
By-elections to the Legislative Assembly of Tonga
Politics of Tonga
Tongatapu